Greenbriar is a census-designated place in Fairfax County, Virginia, United States. The population as of the 2010 census was 8,166. The community between Fairfax City and Chantilly dates from the late 1960s, when it was developed by Levitt & Sons. The community is famous for having only one road within its territory that does not start with an "M" or "P", which is Acorn Hill (added in 1994 with the addition of five mansions to the community). A popular (but not proven) belief is that the roads were named after the architect's two children. One drawback for residents of the community is that with nearly identical sounding named roads (for example, Mayport and Maylock) in such close proximity to each other and house numbers being the same, the US Postal Service along with UPS and FedEx sometimes deliver items to the wrong house.

Geography
Greenbriar is located in western Fairfax County, bordered by Chantilly to the west, Fair Lakes to the south, and Fair Oaks to the east. U.S. Route 50 forms the northern border of the CDP.

Amenities
A private pool is located in the community, but pool memberships are not available for sale from the Pool Club. Instead, residents may choose to purchase their memberships from other members who are selling their memberships. Residents sometimes list those memberships for sale in the community newspaper Greenbriar Flyer. As a member, one makes an annual payment to cover the costs of the pool's maintenance and staff, as well as for hosting swim meets for residents of other communities around Fairfax County. The swim teams at Greenbriar are known as the Greenbriar Dolphins.

Unlike most communities which are bound to a homeowners' association, Greenbriar has only a civic association which collects a strictly voluntary $25 annual donation from each owner, which pays for events that the community hosts throughout the year, including Bands in the Park, where during the summer, local music groups will play for residents at Greenbriar Commons Park; as well as the annual community phone Directory.

The Civic Association, however, has no bylaws for residents, which makes it attractive and a high demand-market community to live in within western Fairfax County.

References

External links
 Greenbriar Town Center, Virginia

Census-designated places in Fairfax County, Virginia
Washington metropolitan area
Census-designated places in Virginia